The eighth season of the American competitive reality television series MasterChef premiered on Fox on May 31, 2017 and concluded on September 20, 2017.

Gordon Ramsay and Christina Tosi returned as judges. Aarón Sánchez joined the cast this season as the third judge.

This season was won by Dino Angelo Luciano with Eboni Henry and Jason Wang finishing as co-runners-up.

Top 20
Source for names, hometowns and occupations: Ages and nicknames as given on air.

 While Mike Newton's elimination occurred from the events on Episode 11 (August 16), his elimination was not revealed until Episode 12 (August 23).

Elimination table
 

 (WINNER) This cook won the competition.
 (RUNNER-UP) This cook finished as a runner-up in the finals.
 (WIN) The cook won the individual challenge (Mystery Box Challenge / Skills Test or Elimination Test).
 (WIN) The cook was on the winning team in the Team Challenge and directly advanced to the next round.
 (HIGH) The cook was one of the top entries in the individual challenge but didn't win.
 (IN) The cook wasn't selected as a top or bottom entry in an individual challenge.
 (IN) The cook wasn't selected as a top or bottom entry in a team challenge.
 (IMM) The cook didn't have to compete in that round of the competition and was safe from elimination.
 (IMM) The cook was selected by Mystery Box Challenge winner and didn't have to compete in the Elimination Test.
 (PT) The cook was on the losing team in the Team Challenge, competed in the Pressure Test, and advanced.
 (NPT) The cook was on the losing team in the Team Challenge, did not compete in the Pressure Test, and advanced.
 (LOW) The cook was one of the bottom entries in an individual challenge or the Pressure Test, but advanced.
 (LOW) The cook was one of the bottom entries in the Team Challenge, but advanced.
 (ELIM) The cook was eliminated from MasterChef.

Episodes

References

2017 American television seasons
MasterChef (American TV series)